Robert Joseph Lithgow (19 March 1881 – 22 April 1951) was an Australian rules footballer who played for the Carlton Football Club in the Victorian Football League (VFL).

Notes

External links 

		
Bert Lithgow's profile at Blueseum

1881 births
1951 deaths
Australian rules footballers from Melbourne
Carlton Football Club players
People from Eltham, Victoria